Boldo is a species of tree endemic to Chile. 

Boldo may also refer to:

Places
Boldo, Alabama, a US town
El Boldo Airport, an airport in Chile
San Boldo Pass, a mountain pass in Italy

People
Dionisio Boldo, 15th- and 16th-century Italian painter
Sylvie Boldo, French computer scientist